Sybille Maria Christina Schmitz (2 December 1909 – 13 April 1955) was a German actress.

Biography
Schmitz attended an acting school in Cologne and got her first engagement at Max Reinhardt's Deutsches Theater in Berlin in 1927. Only one year later, she made her film debut with Freie Fahrt (1928), which attracted her first attention from the critics. Her other early movies include Pabst's Diary of a Lost Girl (1929), Dreyer's Vampyr (1932), and eventually F.P.1 (1932), where she played her first leading role.

Schmitz established herself as a prominent actress in the German cinema with the films which followed including Der Herr der Welt (1934), Abschiedswalzer (1934), Ein idealer Gatte (1935), and Fährmann Maria (1936). She also had roles in Die Umwege des schönen Karl (1937),  (1938), Die Frau ohne Vergangenheit (1939), Trenck, der Pandur (1940) and Titanic (1943). Schmitz's career remained strong even though she was never officially endorsed by the Reichsfilmkammer and had a strenuous relationship with Joseph Goebbels. However, her explicitly non-Aryan appearance relegated her mostly to femme-fatales or problematic foreign women.

After World War II, Schmitz was shunned by the German film community for continuously working during the Third Reich, and it became difficult for her to land roles. She appeared in supporting roles in such movies as Zwischen gestern und morgen (1947), Sensation in Savoy (1950), and Illusion in a Minor Key (1952), but was beset with alcoholism, drug abuse, depression, several suicide attempts and the committal to a psychiatric clinic. Her self-destructive behavior and numerous affairs with both men and women further alienated Schmitz from the film industry and her husband, screenwriter Harald G. Petersson.

Coincidentally, the last film she made less than two years before taking her own life (1953's The House on the Coast, now considered a lost film) had Schmitz's character committing suicide as a last act of desperation.  A much earlier film, Frank Wisbar's The Unknown (1936) ends with the suicide of Schmitz's character, also in a final act of desperate hopelessness.

Death
On 13 April 1955, Schmitz committed suicide with an overdose of sleeping pills; she was 45 years old. At the time of her death, she had been living in Munich with a woman named Ursula Moritz, a physician who allegedly sold her morphine at an inflated rate and kept Schmitz doped up while squandering the little funds she had available to her. Schmitz's family claimed that once the actress proved to be of no more use to Moritz, the physician facilitated her suicide. One year after Schmitz's death, charges were filed against Dr. Moritz for improper medical treatment.

Legacy

Schmitz's final years were used as the basis for Rainer Werner Fassbinder's 1982 movie Die Sehnsucht der Veronika Voss. In 2000, she was the topic of a documentary titled Tanz mit dem Tod: Der Ufa-Star Sybille Schmitz (English: Dance with Death: The Ufa Star Sybille Schmitz), written and directed by Achim Podak.

Both the documentary and the Fassbinder film are available on the Criterion DVD release of Veronika Voss. A ghostly vampire featured in one of the Vampire Hunter D novels is named Sybille Schmitz, a reference to Schmitz's role in Vampyr.

Partial filmography

 Polizeibericht Überfall (1928, Short) - Prostitute
 Tagebuch einer Verlorenen (English title: Diary of a Lost Girl) (1929) - Elisabeth
 Vampyr (1932) - Léone
 F.P.1 (1932) - Claire Lennartz
 Rivalen der Luft (1933) - Sportfliegerin Lisa Holm
 Music in the Blood (1934) - Carola, seine Nichte
 Master of the World (1934) - Vilma, seine Frau
 Farewell Waltz (1934) - George Sand
 Sergeant Schwenke (1935) - Erna Zuwade, Stütze bei Wenkstern
 Punks Arrives from America (1935) - Britta Geistenberg
 Stradivari (1935) - Maria Belloni
 An Ideal Husband (1935) - Gloria Cheveley
 If It Were Not for Music (1935) - Ilonka Badacz
 I Was Jack Mortimer (1935) - Winifred Montemayor, Pedro's wife
 Fährmann Maria (1936) - Maria
 The Emperor's Candlesticks (1936) - Anna Demidow
 The Unknown (1936) - Madeleine
The Chief Witness (1937) - Jelena Rakowska
 Signal in the Night (1937) - Brigitte von Schachen
 Dance on the Volcano (1938) - Gräfin Heloise Cambouilly
 The Roundabouts of Handsome Karl (1938) - Lu Donon - Tochter
 The Stars Shine (1938) - Herself
 Hotel Sacher (1939) - Nadja Woroneff
 Woman Without a Past (1939) - Eva
 Die fremde Frau (1939)
 Trenck, der Pandur (1940) - Prinzessin (princess) Deinhardstein
 Clarissa (1941) - Clarissa von Reckwitz
 Wetterleuchten um Barbara (1941) - Barbara Stammer
 Vom Schicksal verweht (1942) - Dr. Virginia Larsen
 Titanic (1943) - Sigrid Olinsky
 Die Hochstaplerin (1944) - Thea Varèn
 Das Leben ruft (1944) - Hella Warkentin
 Between Yesterday and Tomorrow (1947) - Nelly Dreifuss
 The Last Night (1949) - Renée Meurier
 The Lie (1950) - Susanne, seine Tochter
 Der Fall Rabanser (1950)
 Sensation in Savoy (1950) - Vera Gordon
 Crown Jewels (1950) - Eva Skeravenen
 Illusion in a Minor Key (1952) - Maria Alsbacher
 The House on the Coast (1954) - Anna

Literature
 Brigitte Tast, Hans-Jürgen Tast: Dem Licht, dem Schatten so nah. Aus dem Leben der Sybille Schmitz, Kulleraugen – Visuelle Kommunikation Nr. 46, Schellerten 2015,

References

External links

 
  First Sybille Schmitz Website – from Germany –  The Sybille Schmitz archives.
 Photographs and literature
 

1909 births
1955 deaths
Drug-related suicides in Germany
1955 suicides
German film actresses
People from the Rhine Province
20th-century German actresses
Burials at the Ostfriedhof (Munich)
German stage actresses
Bisexual actresses
LGBT actresses
Female suicides
20th-century German LGBT people